Trapped is an Icelandic television mystery drama series, created by Baltasar Kormákur and produced by RVK Studios. Broadcast in Iceland on RÚV started on 27 December 2015. Co-written by Sigurjón Kjartansson and Clive Bradley, the first series of ten episodes follows Andri Ólafsson (Ólafur Darri Ólafsson), the chief of police in a remote town in Iceland, solving the murder of a former townsman whose mutilated corpse is recovered by fishermen. The series was directed by Kormákur, Baldvin Z, Óskar Thor Axelsson and Börkur Sigthorsson.

Golden Globe winner Jóhann Jóhannsson with Hildur Gudnadóttir and Rutger Hoedemaekers composed the music. Sigurjón Kjartansson acted as executive producer, alongside Kormákur and Magnus V. Sigurdsson as producers. Dagblaðið Vísir reported on 2 May 2015 that Trapped is the most expensive television series ever made in Iceland, with overall costs estimated to be about 1,000,000,000 ISK (€6,500,000 EUR). Before this, most Icelandic television series rarely exceeded production costs of 100–200,000,000 ISK. RVK Studios provided most of the funding, while Creative Europe also supported the project with 75,000,000 ISK. Filming for the first series took place in Siglufjörður, Seyðisfjörður and Reykjavík between December 2014 and May 2015.

The series received its worldwide premiere at the Toronto International Film Festival on 20 September 2015. It has since been sold to numerous broadcasters across the world, including the BBC, which began screening it in the United Kingdom on BBC Four on 13 February 2016. The Weinstein Company announced it had purchased the US distribution rights in September 2015.

In September 2016, RÚV announced that a ten-episode second series had been commissioned for broadcast in late 2018 featuring the same lead characters. Principal photography for the second series began in October 2017 in Siglufjörður. The first episode was premiered on RÚV on 26 December 2018, and broadcast on BBC Four during February/March 2019, with two episodes being shown back-to-back.

Although early work on a third series was already underway by December 2018, with filming commencing in September 2020, the third series did not premiere on RÚV until 17 October 2021. It was released internationally on Netflix under the title Entrapped on 8 September 2022, edited into six episodes, compared to the original eight.

Cast

Main cast
 Ólafur Darri Ólafsson as Andri Ólafsson, Siglufjörður chief of police (season 1), Reykjavík detective (season 2-3)
 Ilmur Kristjánsdóttir as Hinrika Kristjánsdóttir, Siglufjörður police officer, later chief of police
 Ingvar Eggert Sigurðsson as Ásgeir Þórarinsson, Siglufjörður police officer (Season 1-2)
 Björn Hlynur Haraldsson as Trausti Einarssson, chief of the Reykjavik Bureau of Investigation
 Elva María Birgisdóttir as Þórhildur, Andri and Agnes's older daughter, returns to Siglufjörður (Season 1-2)
 Nína Dögg Filippusdóttir as Agnes Eiríksdóttir, Andri's ex-wife, resides in Reykjavík
 Baltasar Breki Samper as Hjörtur Stefánsson, Dagný's boyfriend, who survived the fire; later married, supervisor at Siglufjörður factory (Season 1-2)
 Guðjón Pedersen as Bárður, Hinrika's husband
 Salka Sól Eyfeld as Soffia, friend of Jóhanna
 Júlia Guðrún Lovisa Henje as Perla, Andri and Agnes's younger daughter
 Katla M. Þorgeirsdóttir as Laufey Eiríksdóttir, Agnes's other sister 
 Sigrún Edda Björnsdóttir as Kolbrún, Hrafn's wife, later a local politician

Introduced season 1

 Þorsteinn Gunnarsson as Eiríkur Davidsson, Agnes's father 
 Bjarne Henriksen as Søren Carlsen, ferry captain
 Þorsteinn Bachmann as Sigurður Gudmundsson, harbourmaster, Guðmundur's son
 Pálmi Gestsson as Hrafn Eysteinsson, Siglufjörður mayor, former police chief
 Jóhann Sigurðarson as Leifur, owner of the fish factory and María's father
 Steinunn Ólína Þorsteinsdóttir as Aldís Grímsdóttir, teacher, Sigurður's wife
 Hanna María Karlsdóttir as Þórhildur, Agnes's mother
 Ólafía Hrönn Jónsdóttir as Freyja, Hjörtur's mother
 Rúnar Freyr Gíslason as Sigvaldi, Agnes's new partner
 Jasmín Dúfa Pitt as Jóhanna, Laufey's daughter
 Vytautas Narbutas as Jonas Malakauskas, Lithuanian trafficker
 Grace Achieng as Joy, a Nigerian girl 
 Marta Quental as Nishadi, Joy's younger sister
 Hans Tórgarð as Dvalin Knudsson, ferry engineer
 Georg Leite de Oliveira Santos as Ayanike, ferry chef
 Lilja Nótt Þórarinsdóttir as María, colleague of Hrafn, daughter of Leifur
 Jón Pétursson as Maggi, María's child
 Kristján Franklin Magnúss as Guðni, hotel owner
 Magnús Ragnarsson as Friðrik Davíðsson, an MP
 Sigurður Karlsson as Guðmundur, fisherman
 Eysteinn Sigurðarson as Hjálmar, a young man
 Sigurður Skúlason as Rögnvaldur, man in a wheelchair 
 Jóel Sæmundsson as Þór Snædal, Trausti's colleague
 Arnar Jónsson as Ævar, a senior Reykjavik police officer
 Guðrun Gísladóttir as Ragna, a TV journalist
 Stefán Jónsson as Geirmundur Jónsson
 Rán Ísóld Eysteinsdóttir as Dagný Eiríksdóttir, Agnes's sister who died in a fire 7 years before series 1

Introduced Season 2
 Sólveig Arnarsdóttir as Halla, Minister of Industry
 Þorgeir Tryggvason as Gisli, Halla, Elin and Ólafur's brother
 Steinn Ármann Magnússon as Ketill, Siglufjörður farmer, protests against the factory
 Stormur Jón Kormákur Baltasarsson as Aron, Þórhildur's boyfriend
 Unnur Ösp Stefánsdóttir as Elin, Aron's mother and Halla, Gisli, and Ólafur's sister
 Guðjón Davíð Karlsson as Finnur, Aron's father
 Aron Már Ólafsson as Víkingur, son of Gisli and Steinunn, Siglufjörður factory worker
 Elva Ósk Ólafsdóttir as Steinunn, Vikingur's mother
 Valdimar Örn Flygenring as Ólafur, Steinunn's husband, Halla, Gisli, and Elin's brother
 Kingsford Siayor as Ebo, Ghanaian worker at Siglufjörður factory
 Arnmundur Ernst Björnsson as Stefán, Siglufjörður factory worker
 Valur Freyr Einarsson as David, factory manager
 Dar Salim as Jamal Al Othman
 Sigurbjartur Atlason as Skúli, Ketill's son
 Vignir Rafn Valþórsson as Torfi, Skúli's brother

Introduced Season 3 
 Jôhann Kristôfer Stefánsson as Ívar, a member an Icelandic cult called The Family whose murder is the catalyst for the season's investigation; previously Andri had suspected his involvement in the disappearance of his then girlfriend Lina
 Haraldur Stefannson as Gunnar the estranged son of Oddur Jacobson, patriarch of The Family, and a former friend of Ivar. A member of his uncle's Hopper biker gang The Horns 
 Thomas Bo Larsen as Danish Hopper, the violent leader of the biker gang The Horns; also wanted for his role in a methamphetamine racket
 Egill Ólafsson as Oddur Jacobson, a naturalist and leader of the cult, The Family; father of Gunnar
 Christina M Goldstein as Lina, a missing girl; the sister of Bergur and former girlfriend of Ivar
 Friõrik Rôbertsson as Flosi, a young, misguided member of Gunnar's biker gang
 Emil B Kârason as Logi, Hinrika's nephew
 Baldur T Hreinsson as Kristjan, Ivar's father
 Halldóra Björnsdóttir as Magdalena, Ivar's mother
 Maria Palsdottir as Sigrún, a mortician
 Maria Thelma Smáradóttir as Elisabeth, a lesbian biker in Gunnar's gang
 Íris Tanja Flygenring as Freyja, Danish Hopper's girlfriend
 Heiddis Chadwick Hlynsdottir as Dalla, another member of Gunnar's gang; Elisabeth's girlfriend
 Glôdis Eria Ólafsdóttir as Eva, Gunnar's stepsister
 Skúli Gautason as Örn, police chief superintendent
 Snæfriòur Ingvarsdóttir as Hrönn, a member of The Family who's attacked by The Horns
 Kara Ingudóttir as Sóley, a waitress at Bergur's bar and Ivar's current girlfriend
 Sigurður Þór Óskarsson as Bergur, a drug dealer working as a barista; brother of Lina
 Margrét Vilhjálmsdóttir as Asa, matriarch of The Family; having an affair with Ivar
 Atli Rafn Sigurðsson as Snorri, a member of The Family
 Ingibjörg Stefánsdóttir as Rósa, a member of The Family
 Davíð Guðbrandsson as Sverrir, Bergur's boyfriend and an informant reporting on Danish Hopper
 Hannes Óli Ágústsson as Baby Lars, a member of The Horns and Hopper's righthand man
 Svandis Dora Einarsdottir as Sonja, chief of the narcotics division; investigating Danish Hopper
 Arnar Dan as Haraldur, a narcotics cop
 Björn Jörundur Friðbjörnsson as Ísak, a cop

Episodes

Overview

Series 1 (2016)

Series 2 (2019)

Series 3 (2021)

Broadcast
The first episode received its worldwide premiere at the 2015 Toronto International Film Festival on 20 September 2015, as part of the festival's new Primetime platform of selected television projects. The first series began broadcasting on RÚV in Iceland on 27 December 2015, and broadcasting rights have since been sold to several countries. The series commenced on NRK1 in Norway on 18 January 2016, under the title Innesperret, and on Yle Fem in Finland on 2 February under the titles Fångade (Swedish) and Loukussa (Finnish). The series first aired on BBC Four in the United Kingdom on 13 February and on RTÉ2 in Ireland on 21 February under the title Trapped.

The series has also aired on France 2 in France, and on ZDF in Germany. In Australia, SBS on Demand released the first season for streaming on 16 June 2016, followed by a televisual broadcast on SBS One on 30 November 2016. In Poland, Ale Kino+ began broadcasting the series on 7 September 2016, airing two episodes per week, back-to-back. In Denmark, DR2 began broadcasting the series on 30 November 2016, airing two episodes per week, back-to-back, under the title Fanget.

In the United States, Viceland began broadcasting the first season on 19 February 2017, and the second season premiered on Amazon Prime Video on 10 July 2019. In Belgium, Canvas began broadcasting the series on 11 March 2017. In Portugal, RTP2 began broadcasting the series under the title Encurralados on 13 October 2017. In the Czech Republic, ČT2 began broadcasting the series under the title V Pasti on 12 January 2018. In Italy, TIMvision made the first series available on demand from 5 February 2018.

See also 
 Nordic noir

References

External links

2015 Icelandic television series debuts
Icelandic drama television series
Icelandic-language television shows
Mystery television series
Thriller television series
Television shows set in Iceland
Television shows filmed in Iceland